Terror of the Zygons is the first serial of the 13th season of the British science fiction television series Doctor Who, which was the first broadcast in four weekly parts on BBC1 from 30 August to 20 September 1975. It was the last regular appearance by Ian Marter as companion Harry Sullivan and Nicholas Courtney as Brigadier Lethbridge-Stewart.

The serial is set in and around Loch Ness and in London. In the serial, the alien shapeshifters the Zygons plot to use their cyborg sea monster the Skarasen to take over the Earth after they discover their home planet was destroyed.

Plot
The Fourth Doctor, Sarah Jane Smith and Harry Sullivan arrive via the TARDIS in Scotland near the North Sea where Brigadier Lethbridge-Stewart and U.N.I.T. are investigating the destruction of oil rigs. The survivors' assertion that the rigs were destroyed by a huge sea creature is corroborated by giant teeth marks in the wreckage.

During their investigation, Harry is captured by the Zygons, a shape-shifting alien race hiding in their submerged spacecraft. Their leader, Broton, tells Harry that their spaceship had sustained damage and landed on Earth centuries ago to await rescue, but when they discovered that their home planet had been destroyed in a stellar explosion they decided instead to conquer the Earth and terraform it to suit their physiology. To achieve this goal, they have captured several humans to use as "body prints" to infiltrate key leadership positions, including the influential Duke of Forgill who serves as head of the Scotland Energy Commission. They had also brought an embryonic sea creature called the Skarasen to Earth and augmented it with cyborg technology until it has reached giant proportions. They are directing it with a signalling device to attack the rigs as part of their larger plan.

Whilst investigating the similarity between the Skarasen and the monster in nearby Loch Ness, Sarah Jane stumbles upon a secret passageway at the Duke of Forgill's mansion. She follows the passage to the Zygons' submerged spacecraft. Whilst searching the ship she locates and frees Harry, who reveals the Zygon stratagem.

With their presence discovered, Broton accelerates their plan. He takes the Duke's form and leaves for London, while the remaining Zygons fly their ship to a nearby quarry, starting reactors to convert the Earth's atmosphere to one hospitable to Zygons but poisonous to humans. The Doctor sneaks aboard the ship, frees the remaining humans and sets the ship to self-destruct, killing the Zygon crew.

Among the rescued humans, the Duke warns that he was scheduled to attend the first international energy conference in London that day, at which several high-level dignitaries will be in attendance. With the conference located in a building near the Thames, the Doctor fears that Broton will lure the Skarasen to attack the conference. U.N.I.T. races them to London but, before the Doctor can stop him, Broton activates the signalling device. The Brigadier kills Broton, and the Doctor recovers the device just as the Skarasen surfaces. The Doctor throws the device into the Thames, the creature eats it and, no longer a threat, returns to Loch Ness.

The group returns to Scotland to close up the investigation, with the Brigadier reporting that the Cabinet will cover up the incident. The Doctor offers them all a return trip back to London via the TARDIS, but the Brigadier and Harry decline.

Production 
Interested in gaining new writers for Doctor Who, script editor Robert Holmes discussed ideas for the programme with Robert Banks Stewart. After their meeting in early 1974, Stewart devised a storyline for a six-part adventure called The Secret of Loch Ness. Stewart felt that Scotland's legendary Loch Ness Monster would make an ideal basis for a story because there were so few details about the mythical creature. Although at first focusing on the Loch Ness Monster itself, Holmes encouraged Stewart to concentrate more on the Zygons, the shape-shifting aliens of the story. As the story evolved, it was known variously as The Loch, The Secret of the Loch, The Loch Ness Monster, The Zygons and finally Terror of the Zygons.

Terror of the Zygons was originally intended as the finale for Season 12, ending the TARDIS crew's continuous adventures and delivering Harry Sullivan back to Earth. Instead, due to scheduling concerns, the serial was held back as the first story of Season 13.

Due to budgetary constraints, location filming in Scotland was not possible and outdoor scenes for Terror of the Zygons were all shot in West Sussex. The North Sea beach scenes were filmed on the beach at Climping; scenes on Tulloch Moor were shot on the common at South Ambersham in the South Downs; and the landing area for the Zygon spaceship was filmed at Hall Aggregates Quarry in Storrington.

Cast notes 
John Woodnutt had previously appeared as Hibbert in Spearhead from Space (1970) and the Draconian Emperor in Frontier in Space (1973), and would go on to play Consul Seron in The Keeper of Traken (1981). Angus Lennie previously played Storr in The Ice Warriors (1967).

This was Nicholas Courtney's last regular appearance in the series.  The Brigadier would next be seen in Mawdryn Undead, almost eight years later.

Broadcast and reception

In The Television Companion (1998), David J. Howe and Stephen James Walker wrote that Terror of the Zygons gave a stereotypical portrayal of the Scottish and showed how much the show had changed since abandoning its regular UNIT premise. They felt that the story gave UNIT its "dignity and believability" and praised the conception of the Zygons, though they noted that the shape-shifting concept was not original. Despite classifying the Skarasen as the "major weakness", they said "the story remains a strong one". In 2010, Mark Braxton of Radio Times praised the "exquisitely horrible" design of the Zygons and the cliff-hanger of the first episode where a Zygon attacks Sarah. He also was positive towards guest actor John Woodnutt and the incidental music, calling the whole production "a class act", aside from the Loch Ness Monster. DVD Talk's John Sinnott gave the story four and a half out of five stars, praising the cast and the design of the Zygons.

Ian Berriman of SFX felt that it was "churlish" to criticise the Loch Ness Monster effect when the story "gets so much right, including first-class direction, pitch-perfect performances and a hauntingly eerie, folky score". He also was positive towards the design of the Zygons and their spaceship, though he found their scheme far-fetched. Christopher Bahn, reviewing the story for The A.V. Club, described it as "fun" but noted that it could be formulaic instead of trying to be "groundbreaking"; he criticised the scene in the second episode in which Broton tells Harry everything about the Zygons, which did not leave much surprise for the later episodes. Nevertheless, he praised the cast, the action sequences, and the Zygons, which he described as "wonderfully surreal triumph of Doctor Who visual design", though otherwise they functioned as a typical monster-of-the-week.

Reviewing the serial in 1999, literary critic John Kenneth Muir acclaimed Terror of the Zygons as "a riveting and horrifying adventure", singling out the fleshy Zygon costumes for particular praise. He drew parallels with a number of historic Doctor Who serials, noting that the Zygon story drew on some familiar Doctor Who ingredients, including alien invasion (The Invasion), "body snatchers" (The Faceless Ones), an oil rig setting (Fury from the Deep), biomechanical technology (The Claws of Axos) and the revelation of an ancient Earth legend to be alien in origin (The Dæmons). However, he was disparaging of the use of a glove puppet to represent the Loch Ness Monster, comparing it to "the Invasion of the Dinosaurs debacle".

Commercial releases

In print 

A novelisation of this serial, written by Terrance Dicks, was published by Target Books in January 1976 under the title Doctor Who and the Loch Ness Monster. It was later republished under the original title, in 1993, with a cover by Alister Pearson. In the novelisation, the Zygons have a deadly sting, the TARDIS momentarily disappears after landing and the Prime Minister is a man.

Home media 
Terror of the Zygons first came out on VHS in November 1988, having been previously available only in Australia; this was in an omnibus format. It was first released in complete and unedited episodic format on Laserdisc in 1997, followed by a new VHS release, also in episodic format, in August 1999 in the United Kingdom, and released in 2000 in the United States and Canada.

The story was released on DVD on 30 September 2013. It features a "director's cut" version of Part One with a previously unseen and newly restored 1 min 40 second opening scene featuring the Doctor, Sarah and Harry arriving in the TARDIS, which has materialised invisibly due to a faulty fusion plate. The restored scene has been recoloured by Stuart Humphryes. A single disc version (with no extras) of the DVD formed part of the Fourth Doctor Time Capsule released on 29 July 2013.

Soundtrack

Geoffrey Burgon's music for his Doctor Who serials Terror of the Zygons and The Seeds of Doom were released on CD by BBC Music 24 January 2000. The CD was sourced from the composer's own copies of the score, recorded at a low speed, resulting in lower fidelity.

Track listing

Notes

References

Bibliography 

 
 Haining, Peter. Doctor Who: 25 Glorious Years W H Allen (1988)

External links

Target novelisation 

Fourth Doctor serials
Doctor Who serials novelised by Terrance Dicks
1975 British television episodes
Doctor Who stories set on Earth
Loch Ness Monster in television
UNIT serials
Television episodes set in Scotland